Matteo Martino (born January 28, 1987, in Alessandria) is an Italian volleyball player. He finished 4th with his team at the 2008 Summer Olympics. Since 2014 he has been playing for French club Montpellier UC.

Career

Clubs

Sporting achievements
 2007 Junior World Championship "Best Scorer"
 2007 Junior World Championship "Best Spiker"
 2007 Junior World Championship "Best Receiver"

References 

1987 births
Living people
People from Alessandria
Italian men's volleyball players
Olympic volleyball players of Italy
Volleyball players at the 2008 Summer Olympics
Jastrzębski Węgiel players
Sportspeople from the Province of Alessandria
Italian expatriate sportspeople in China
Italian expatriate sportspeople in Poland
Italian expatriate sportspeople in France
Italian expatriate sportspeople in Russia
Expatriate volleyball players in China
Expatriate volleyball players in France
Expatriate volleyball players in Russia
Expatriate volleyball players in Poland
Italian expatriate sportspeople in Saudi Arabia